National Botanical Garden of Iran is a Botanical Garden in Tehran, Iran. Its area is about 150 hectares and is planned to be the main center for horticulture and plant taxonomy in Iran. A herbarium of Iranian plants (TARI) is gradually being built up and now consists of some 160,000 numbers. Also there are gardens of non-Iranian plants such as Himalayan, American, Japanese, African, and Australian.

The garden also contains an arboretum, Six lakes, hills (to represent the Alborz and Zagros mountains and Himalayas), rock garden, a waterfall, a wetland, desert plants areas, a salt lake and a wadi, a river about 1 km long, systematic area, fruit garden, picnic area with some pavilions and other facilities. The botanical and horticultural library has more than 11,000 volumes.

References

External links 

 Web page
 Photo Gallery of National botanical garden of Iran/Tehran

Botanical gardens in Iran
Gardens in Iran
Tourist attractions in Tehran
Parks in Tehran